Avella is a town in Italy.

Avella may also refer to:
 Avella, Pennsylvania, a village in southwestern Pennsylvania
 Kia Avella, an automobile
 Avella, a synonym of the spider genus Menneus
 Giovanni d’Avella, author of Regole di musica, divise in cinque trattati (Rome, 1657)